David Johan Mejía Crawford (born August 23, 2003) is a Peruvian professional footballer who plays as a midfielder for Atlanta United 2.

Mejía joined the Atlanta United FC Academy in 2018, after moving to the Atlanta area from Jacksonville, Florida.

Career statistics

Club

Notes

References

2003 births
Living people
Association football midfielders
Peruvian footballers
American soccer players
Atlanta United 2 players
USL Championship players
Jacksonville Armada FC players
Footballers from Lima
Peru youth international footballers
Soccer players from Florida
Sportspeople from Jacksonville, Florida